"Nem Um Talvez" is a jazz standard composed by Hermeto Pascoal, first appearing on the Miles Davis 1971 album Live-Evil. On the record, it is wrongly attributed to Miles Davis.

Overview
Another well-known recording of the song is on the album Sanctuary by Barney Wilen, featuring Philip Catherine and Palle Danielsson.

More recently, it has been recorded by the Jason Marsalis Vibes Quartet on the record In a World of Mallets. It also was recorded by David Snider on his album Echoes of the Masters, to be released.

References

External links
Skymaster's' version on YouTube

1970s jazz standards